Robert John "Bob" Skilton  (born 8 November 1938) is a former Australian rules footballer who represented  in the Victorian Football League (VFL).

Playing as a rover, Skilton is one of only four players to have won the Brownlow Medal three times—in 1959 (when he tied with Verdun Howell), 1963, and 1968. His Brownlow record is shared by Fitzroy's Haydn Bunton, Sr (1931, 1932, 1935), Essendon's Dick Reynolds (1934, 1937, 1938), and St.Kilda's Ian Stewart (1965, 1966, 1971).

He was rated by Jack Dyer as better than Haydn Bunton, Sr and equal to Dick Reynolds, making him one of the best players in the history of the game.

The Sydney Swans Best and Fairest medal is named after him; the Bob Skilton Medal.

Family
The son of Robert Herbert Skilton (1901-1987), and Rita Skilton (1904-), née McFarlane, Robert John Skilton was born on 8 November 1938.

His father, known as "Bobby", was a 440-yard professional athlete who also played 149 games for Port Melbourne in the VFA from 1922 to 1929. As a prisoner of war of the Japanese, he survived the ordeal of working on the infamous Burma Railway.

He married Marion Joyce Stirling in 1960.

Football
Only 171 cm tall, Skilton was particularly fast and a superb baulker, allowing him to evade opponents when necessary. He was never shy of attacking the ball, however, and in his 16-year career suffered many injuries, including concussion, a broken nose four times, a broken wrist three times and 12 black eyes.

One of his greatest assets was the ability to kick with both feet, a skill learned at the insistence of his father, and developed by spending hours kicking the ball against a wall, collecting it on the rebound and kicking again with the other foot. It was impossible to say whether he was right or left footed, since his left foot gave greater accuracy, but his right greater distance. He had arguably the most accurate stab kick in the game.

Star of the 1953 Victorian Schoolboys' team (he kicked 8 goals against West Australia in one of the championship's matches), and best and fairest for the South Melbourne (under 17) Fourth XVIII which played in the Melbourne Boys League in 1955, Skilton made his senior debut at the age of 17 in round five, 1956 and went on to play 237 matches for South Melbourne before he retired in 1971, at the time a club record. He scored 412 goals in that time and was the club's leading goalkicker on three occasions. Nicknamed 'Chimp', he showed great grit and determination and became well known for giving maximum effort at all times.

It was his appearance on the front page of The Sun News-Pictorial in 1968 with two black eyes that earned him the Douglas Wilkie Medal. The black eyes were a consequence of a severe facial injury, which included depressed fractures of his cheekbones, due to collisions in successive weeks from Footscray's Ken Greenwood, his own teammate John Rantall and then Len Thompson.

An extended series of graphic photographs displaying the true extent of Skilton's injury used to be on display at the team's rooms at the Lake Oval, prior to its move to Sydney (it is not on display in Sydney and it is commonly understood that it was first removed from display at the Lake Oval as part of the effort to get Tuddenham to coach South Melbourne in 1978).

He missed the entire 1969 VFL season after snapping an Achilles tendon in a pre-season practice match against SANFL club Port Adelaide.

Chosen to represent his state in 25 games, Skilton captained the Victorian team in 1963 and 1965. The downside of his career was the lack of success of his club. He often said that he would trade any of his three Brownlow Medals for a premiership or even the chance to play in a Grand Final, and felt the highest point of his career was the one occasion South Melbourne made the finals in 1970 (under the great Norm Smith), finishing fourth after losing the first semi-final against St Kilda.

After 16 years at South Melbourne, including two years as playing coach in 1965–1966,  and nine club best and fairest awards, Skilton then played for his boyhood team, Port Melbourne in the Victorian Football Association and later coached Melbourne from 1974–1977, with a best finish of sixth. Since then, Skilton has been honoured by being named captain of the Swans' team of the century, and named in the AFL team of the century. He was also the player featured inside the cover of the booklets of stamps featuring the Swans released by Australia Post to commemorate the centenary of the VFL/AFL.

Skilton made a speech in the post-match presentations of the 2005 AFL Grand Final following his team's first win in 72 years, and was tasked to present the trophy at the 2012 AFL Grand Final.

Skilton is also the number 1 ticket holder at the Ormond Amateur Football Club who compete in the Victorian Amateur Football Association.

Order of Australia Medal
In the 2018 Queens Birthday Honours, Skilton was awarded the Order of Australia Medal (OAM).

References

Bibliography

External links
 
 
 Profile at Australian Football
 Robert (Jnr) "Bob" Skilton at The VFA Project.
 Bob Skilton: Boyles Football Photos.
 Speaker Profile at A Positive Move

1938 births
Living people
Sydney Swans players
Sydney Swans coaches
Melbourne Football Club coaches
Brownlow Medal winners
Australian Football Hall of Fame inductees
 
Douglas Wilkie Medal winners
Australian rules footballers from Victoria (Australia)
Recipients of the Medal of the Order of Australia
Sport Australia Hall of Fame inductees